District 13 is a 2004 French film.

It can also refer to:

District 13, an electoral district of Malta
District 13: Ultimatum, a 2009 sequel to the 2004 film
District 13 Police Station, a historic police station in Boston, Massachusetts, USA
District 13 (Hunger Games), fiction district in the Hunger Games books and films

See also
District 12 (disambiguation)